Bolshoye Yuryevo is a rural locality (a village) in Kovarditskoye Rural Settlement, Muromsky District, Vladimir Oblast, Russia. The population was 21 as of 2010. There are 5 streets.

Geography 
Bolshoye Yuryevo is located on the Kartyn River, 14 km west of Murom (the district's administrative centre) by road. Maloye Yuryevo is the nearest rural locality.

References 

Rural localities in Muromsky District
Muromsky Uyezd